Shendam is a Local Government Area in Plateau State, Nigeria. Its headquarters are in the town of Shendam. It is bordered by Ibi Taraba State to the south, Qua'an Pan to the east, Pankshin to the north, and Mikang to the west.

It has an area of 2,477 km and a population of 208,017 at the 2006 census.
 
The postal code of the area is 940.

The Goemai language and many other West Chadic languages are spoken in Shendam LGA.

References

Local Government Areas in Plateau State